De la Cruz, usually capitalized as de la Cruz, is a Spanish surname meaning "of the Cross". It may refer to:

People
 Apolinario de la Cruz (1815–1841), Filipino religious leader
 Bethania de la Cruz (born 1987), Dominican volleyball player
 Bryan De La Cruz (born 1996), Dominican baseball player
 Cacho de la Cruz (born 1937), Argentine-Uruguayan entertainer
 Carlos de la Cruz, Cuban-American chairman of CC1 Companies
 David de la Cruz (born 1989), Spanish cyclist
 Eulogio de la Cruz (1984–2021), Dominican baseball player
 Fernando de la Cruz (born 1971), Dominican baseball player
 Francisco Dela Cruz (1962–2019), Northern Mariana Islands politician
 Jerry De La Cruz (born 1948), American artist
 Jessica de la Cruz (born 1981), American politician
 José María de la Cruz (1799–1875), Chilean general and politician
 José de la Cruz (1746–1829), Filipino writer more popularly known as Huseng Sisiw
 Juan de la Cruz (1542–1591), Spanish friar and poet
 Joshua Dela Cruz (born 1989), Filipino-American actor known for Blue's Clues & You!
 Juana Inés de la Cruz (1648–1695), Mexican scholar, poet, and nun
 Magdalena de la Cruz (1487–1560), Spanish Franciscan nun of Cordova
 Melissa de la Cruz (born 1971), American author
 Nicolás de la Cruz (born 1997), Uruguayan footballer
 Oswaldo de la Cruz, Peruvian politician
 Ramón de la Cruz (1731–1794), Spanish neoclassical dramatist
 Tommy de la Cruz (1911–1958), Dominican baseball player
 Ulises de la Cruz (born 1974), Ecuadorian footballer
 Veronica De La Cruz (born 1980), Filipino-American television anchor
 Monica De La Cruz, American politician

Fictional characters
 Cruz de la Cruz, a central character in John H. Ritter's 2003 novel The Boy Who Saved Baseball
 Ernesto de la Cruz, a character from the 2017 Pixar film, Coco
 Estela de la Cruz, a character in the Netflix series 13 Reasons Why
 Mitch de la Cruz, a character from the animated series Get Blake!
 Montgomery “Monty” de la Cruz, a character in the Netflix series 13 Reasons Why
 Guillermo de la Cruz, a vampire servant / hunter in the HBO series What We Do in the Shadows (TV series)

Music
 De La Cruz, an 80's-influenced hard rock band from Australia
 Juan de la Cruz Band, a 70's hard rock band from the Philippines

See also
 Caravaca de la Cruz, a town in Spain
 Puerto de la Cruz, a city on the island of Tenerife
 Juan de la Cruz, a demonym for Filipinos
 Delacroix
 Dellacroce
 Aroldis Chapman, maternal name de la Cruz, Cuban relief pitcher for the New York Yankees

Spanish-language surnames
Surnames of Filipino origin